"I Must Have Lost it on the Wind" is the season premiere of the eleventh season of the American television medical drama Grey's Anatomy, and is the 221st episode overall. It aired on September 25, 2014 on ABC in the United States. The episode was written by Stacy McKee and directed by Kevin McKidd. On its initial airing it was watched by 9.8 million viewers which was an increase from the tenth season finale "Fear (of the Unknown)". The episode is also the most watched episode of the entire season.

In the episode the doctors at Grey Sloan Memorial Hospital, Meredith Grey (Ellen Pompeo) in particular deals with the departure of Cristina Yang (Sandra Oh) in the finale of the previous season and the episode also marks the arrival of Maggie Pierce (Kelly McCreary) the half-sister of Meredith and the daughter of Richard Webber (James Pickens Jr.). Caterina Scorsone who portrays Amelia Shepherd is promoted to a series regular starting with this episode after recurring in the previous season.

Plot
The episode starts with the ever-present into voice-over, with Meredith reflecting on memories. We quickly learn that they are a tricky business, as she reflects back on a day we’ve seen before, Richard breaking up with Ellis at the carousel. She remembers calling the ambulance when Ellis slit her wrists, and a doctor advising her that she saved her mother's life. What she doesn't realize is that her memories aren’t completely accurate. We hear a baby cry and Ellis say she doesn't want to see "her." Meredith remembers it as the same day, but we see her in a different dress outside the hospital curtain. We, as viewers, now know the timeline of Maggie's birth, but clearly Meredith has suppressed the memory.

Now that Cristina is no longer at Grey Sloan Memorial Hospital, Maggie Pierce must step up to the plate as the new cardio-thoracic surgeon. Meredith and Maggie clash in the OR in true sister fashion as their personalities are complete opposites. Callie and Arizona debate over the use of a surrogate; Callie initially doesn't want a surrogate, but changes her mind realizing that one can't control everything. Arizona wants to shelf the idea altogether in order to become a fetal surgery fellow, which means going back to school.

April's worried about Owen being alone after Cristina's departure and decides he needs a new buddy. Jackson offers up drinks, Richard chimes in for Jenga, and Derek flat out invites him for a man-date. Owen declares himself fine, but we'll see how long that lasts. Alex and Bailey fight for Cristina's position on the board. Richard, Jackson, and Derek try to distract Owen from Cristina's departure by inviting him to hang out on a "man date thing." Meredith leans to Alex to console the loss of her best friend, which makes Jo jealous. Derek tells Meredith that he chooses her and the kids over his brain mapping initiative in Washington, D.C.

Production

On August 13, 2013, Sandra Oh revealed that she would be leaving after Season 10 of Grey's Anatomy. Thus, this is the first season in which Dr. Cristina Yang, portrayed by Sandra Oh, is not included in the main cast of characters.

Creator Shonda Rhimes on Oh's exit said, "I know Sandra pretty well. It was one of those things where I so wished it wasn't true for many reasons. For me, as a human being, I love spending time with Sandra, and as a writer, writing for Sandra is one of the best things that's ever happened to me. I would hope that it wouldn't be happening -- but I also know Sandra, and I know that it's time for her to have new challenges. I get to have new challenges all the time because I get to create other shows, but she doesn't get to do that, so I fully understood it."

On being asked about what was her takeaway from the journey by The Hollywood Reporter Oh replied, " It's Ellen's (Pompeo) line where she says, "I am not finished." What was challenging for me was, I was finishing. I spent the past year finishing to get the character to this moment. But for me, it was the specific interpretation I had of Cristina saying, "I am not finished." That speech fills me now. That speech is about how she is not finished. Anyway, I wish I said that more eloquently because I cannot tell you how much that line means to me."

Reception

Broadcast
"I Must Have Lost it on the Wind" was originally broadcast on September 25, 2014, in the United States on the American Broadcasting Company (ABC). The episodes were watched by a total of 9.81 million. In the key 18-49 demographic, the episode scored a 3.1/11 in Nielsen ratings, It was ranked 22 in overall viewership and 18 in 18-49 demographics.

Reviews
The episode received mostly positive reviews from the critics. Tv Fanatic wrote, "The acting remains stellar, the drama is mixed with just the right amount of humor and darn it if I'm not now wrapped up in the future of MerDer." Entertainment Weekly gave a mixed to positive review to the episode saying, "Overall, it wasn’t a particularly memorable hour, but it was a good note on which to start a season. It was a way to show the fans that things can go back to normal even in a world without Yang. But considering that the show can’t replace Yang with an outdoor windstorm every week, it’ll be interesting to see where we go from here."

On Cristina's exit TV.com wrote, "So, the question I had heading into (Grey's Anatomy'''s) Season 11 premiere was just how much Cristina's absence would be felt. And at the end, I have to say-while the lack of Yang was definitely noticeable, I think the show will be just fine with out her." Cartermatt'' called Ellen Pompeo the star of the premiere, "Ellen Pompeo’s performance was great throughout this, and understated in much of the same way it often is. Her subtlety is probably why she is often overlooked. This was most present in the episode’s final moment, as Derek turned down the Washington DC job, which she clearly things he did just because she wanted him to."

References

Grey's Anatomy (season 11) episodes
2014 American television episodes